Eight ships of the Royal Navy have borne the name HMS Advice:

  was a 9-gun full-rigged pinnace launched in 1586 and sold in 1617.
  was a 40-gun fourth rate  frigate launched in 1650, and captured by French privateers in 1711.
  was a 50-gun fourth rate launched in 1712. She was renamed HMS Milford in 1744, and was sold in 1749.
  was a 50-gun fourth rate launched in 1745, and broken up in 1756.
  was a 10-gun cutter purchased in 1779, and wrecked in 1793.
  was a 4-gun cutter launched in 1796 and last listed in 1799.
  was an advice boat launched in 1800 and sold in 1805.
  was a paddle packet ship launched for the GPO as Vixen in 1823. She was transferred to the Navy in 1837 and was sold in 1870.

See also

References
 

Royal Navy ship names